Stelechocarpus is a genus of flowering plants belonging to the family Annonaceae.

Its native range is Indo-China to Western and Central Malesia.

Species:
 Stelechocarpus burahol (Blume) Hook.f. & Thomson 
 Stelechocarpus cauliflorus (Scheff.) R.E.Fr. 
 Stelechocarpus expansus (Chaowasku) I.M.Turner

References

Annonaceae
Annonaceae genera